Utricularia buntingiana is a small epiphytic, perennial carnivorous plant that belongs to the genus Utricularia. U. buntingiana is endemic to Venezuela, where it is only known from a few locations: the type location in Henri Pittier National Park, one collection on the Paraguaná Peninsula, and a few others from Falcón. It was originally published and described by Peter Taylor in 1975. It has been seen flowering in June and July. Both U. buntingiana and U. praetermissa possess a double-curved corolla spur.

See also 
 List of Utricularia species

References 

Carnivorous plants of South America
Flora of Venezuela
buntingiana
Epiphytes